Viola hastata, commonly known as the halberd-leaved yellow violet, is a perennial plant in the violet family found in the eastern United States. It blooms from March to May with yellow flowers.

References

External links

hastata